Hotel Nikko San Francisco is a high-rise hotel at 222 Mason Street near Union Square, San Francisco, California. The  28-story hotel has 532 hotel rooms, and is owned by DATAM, LLC. and operated by Nikko Hotels. The hotel is one block away from Union Square, San Francisco and five blocks from the Moscone Center. The hotel opened in October 1987.

Description 
The hotel was designed by AMTAD, Inc. and Whisler- Patri Architects and built by Takenaka. It underwent a $60 million renovation commemorating from December 2016 to March 2017, during which time the hotel was closed. The renovation was led by Hirsch Bedner Associates.

The hotel has 16 guest floors, 11 elevators, a health club, spa, lounge, cabaret room, and a restaurant. Restaurant ANZU is located on the second floor and is visible from the lobby. ANZU, is overseen by Hotel Nikko's Food and Beverage Director, Chef Phillippe Striffeler. Striffeler was named one of five 2015 recipients of the Antonin Carême Medal presented by the American Culinary Federation’s San Francisco Chapter on November 16, 2015.

References

External links

Skyscraper hotels in San Francisco
1987 establishments in California
Buildings and structures completed in 1987
Hotels established in 1987
Hotel buildings completed in 1987